Dombås Station is a railway station located at Dombås in Dovre, Norway. The station is located on the Dovre Line as well as serving as the terminal station for the Rauma Line. The station is served by express trains on the Dovre Line and regional trains on the Rauma Line. The station was built in 1913 when the Dovre Line was extended to Dombås.

The restaurant was taken over by Norsk Spisevognselskap on 15 November 1924. The building burned down on 23 April 1940 during the German occupation of Norway. A kiosk was immediately opened, and remained in use until the new station building and restaurant opened on 1 July 1941.

The first American killed in World War II, Captain Robert M. Losey, lost his life here on April 21, 1940, when a German aircraft bombed the station.

References

Railway stations in Oppland
Railway stations on the Dovre Line
Railway stations on the Rauma Line
Railway stations opened in 1913
1913 establishments in Norway
Dovre